Jambarjuq (also Romanized as Jambarjūq; also known as Jambarju, Jambarjūg, Jām Barjūy, Jambaz Jūq, Jamīz Jaraq, and Janbarjūq) is a village in Meshkan Rural District, Meshkan District, Khoshab County, Razavi Khorasan Province, Iran. At the 2006 census, its population was 770, in 176 families.

References 

Populated places in Khoshab County